Jarod Alexander Arroyo (born 2 January 2001) is a Puerto Rican swimmer. In 2019, he represented Puerto Rico at the 2019 World Aquatics Championships in Gwangju, South Korea.

In 2018, he won the gold medal in the men's 200 metre individual medley event at the 2018 Central American and Caribbean Games held in Barranquilla, Colombia.

References

External links 
 

Living people
2001 births
Place of birth missing (living people)
Puerto Rican male swimmers
Male medley swimmers
Competitors at the 2018 Central American and Caribbean Games
Central American and Caribbean Games gold medalists for Puerto Rico
Central American and Caribbean Games medalists in swimming
Swimmers at the 2018 Summer Youth Olympics
Swimmers at the 2020 Summer Olympics
Olympic swimmers of Puerto Rico
Arizona State Sun Devils men's swimmers